Juan Bravo ( 1483–1521) was a leader of a 16th-century revolt in Spain.

Juan Bravo can also refer to:

Juan Bravo (athlete), Chilean long-distance runner
Juan Bravo Murillo (1803–1873), Spanish politician
Juan Bravo (navy officer) (born 1865), Mapuche-Chilean sniper